Yami language, also known as Tao language, is a Malayo-Polynesian language spoken by the Tao people of Orchid Island, 46 kilometers southeast of Taiwan. It is a member of the Ivatan dialect continuum.

Yami is known as  'human speech' by its native speakers. Native speakers prefer the 'Tao' name.

Classification

Yami is the only native language of Taiwanese aborigines that is not a member of the Formosan grouping of Austronesian; it is one of the Batanic languages also found in the northern Philippines, and as such is part of the Malayo-Polynesian branch of Austronesian.

Phonology
Yami has 20 consonants and 4 vowels:

Vowels 

 /o/ can be heard as [ʊ] after labial stop consonants.

Iraralay Yami, spoken on the north coast, distinguishes between geminative consonants (e.g.,  'thigh' vs.  'hen' form one such minimal pair).

Consonants 

 /k ʁ/ can also be heard as sounds [q ɦ] when between vowel /a/ intervocalically.
 Sounds /n l ʂ/ can be heard as sounds [ɲ ɮ ʃ] before /i/.

Grammar

Pronouns 
The following set of pronouns is found in the Yami language.

Verbs
The following list are verbal inflections found in Yami.

Dynamic intransitive
-om-/om- (subjunctive: N-)
mi-
ma-
maN-
maka-
maci-/masi-/macika-/macipa-

Stative
ma- (subjunctive: a-)
ka- ... -an (subjunctive: ka- ... -i)

Dynamic
pi-
pa-
paN- (subjunctive: maN-)
paka- (subjunctive: maka-)
paci- (subjunctive: maci-)

Transitive
-en (subjunctive: -a)
-an (subjunctive: -i)
i- (subjunctive: -an)

Stative functioning as transitive
ma- (subjunctive: a- ... -a)
ka- ... -an (subjunctive: a- ... -a)

Affixes
The following is a list of affixes found in Yami.

icia- 'fellows such and such who share the same features or fate'
ikeyka- 'even more so'
ika- 'feel such and such because...'
ika- 'ordinal number'
ipi- 'multiple number'
ji a- 'negation or emphatic'
ka- 'company, as ... as, abstract noun'
ka- 'and then, just now, only'
ka- 'stative verb prefix reappearing in forming transitive verbs'
ka- (reduplicated root) 'very'
ka- (reduplicated root) 'animals named after certain features'
ka- ... -an 'common noun'
ma- ... -en 'love to do such and such'
mapaka- 'pretend to be such and such'
mapi- 'do such and such as an occupation'
mi-/mala- 'kinship relationships in a group of two or three'
mika-/mapika-/ipika- 'all, gradually, one by one'
mala- 'taste or look like...'
mipa- 'getting more and more...'
mipipa- 'even more...'
mapi-/mapa-/pa- ... -en/ipa- 'causative verb affixes'
ni- 'perfective'
ni- ... na 'superlative'
noka- 'past'
noma- 'future (remote)'
- 'present'
sima- 'future (proximal)'
tey- 'direction'
tey- 'very, too'
tey- (reduplicated root) 'amount allocated to each unit

Vocabulary

Cognates with Philippine languages

Japanese loanwords

Chinese loanwords

See also
Languages of Taiwan
Taiwanese aborigines
Tao people
Batanic languages
Ivatan language

References

Sources

Further reading

External links

 Yami wordlists at the Austronesian Basic Vocabulary Database: language.psy.auckland.ac.nz/austronesian/language.php?id=254, language.psy.auckland.ac.nz/austronesian/language.php?id=335  
 Yami Language Documentation Project website – hosted by Providence University, Taiwan
 Online Yami language course – hosted by Providence University, Taiwan
 Yami Dictionary Project website  – hosted by Providence University, Taiwan
 Yuán zhù mínzú yǔyán xiànshàng cídiǎn 原住民族語言線上詞典  – Yami search page at the "Aboriginal language online dictionary" website of the Indigenous Languages Research and Development Foundation
 Yami teaching and leaning materials published by the Council of Indigenous Peoples of Taiwan 
 Yami translation of President Tsai Ing-wen's 2016 apology to indigenous people – published on the website of the presidential office

Languages of Taiwan
Batanic languages
Vulnerable languages